Nurollah Beyglu (also Romanized as Nūrollāh Beyglū) is a village in Pain Barzand Rural District, Anguti District, Germi County, Ardabil Province, Iran. At the 2006 census, its population was 93, in 20 families.

References 

Tageo

Towns and villages in Germi County